The culture of Prizren consists of a rare blend of the various identities which make up Kosovo. Prizren is a community where different cultures and civilizations have come together, contributing to the city's cultural development over the centuries.

Prizren has been known since antiquity as having a unique place in the Balkans, with its diverse cultural components stemming from its civilizations and religions. Thanks to its favorable geographic setting, its wide selection of monuments, and its archaeological heritage, the city of Prizren rightfully has been called the "museum city", "museum under the open sky" or even the "Dubrovnik of the Balkans", and has been described as one of Kosovo's most beautiful cities.

There is an old proverb saying "Whoever drinks water from the fountain will have find it difficult to leave Prizren". Historians say "Every stone of Prizren is a history unto itself", while one of the local songs goes: "Prizren is the city of song and love".

Art
Prizren's buildings exhibit a variety of artistic features, including a number of buildings with high domes. Art is a constant a source of the city's traditions, supplemented by literature and song. This is evidenced by the strings of the qiftelia and mandolin.

Theater

Prizren has always been revered as a city where a variety of cultural events have been established. Theatre arts are an example of these cultural developments that had their start in Prizren, paving their way for success in other cities of Kosovo as well. Theatre arts in Prizren have started to develop around the 1880s, right after the first Albanian school was opened in 1878, when the first theatrical plays were most likely played by students in the first-opened schools. One of the first contributors that indicated the success of these plays were Mati Logoreci and Lazër Lumezi, both first instructors in Prizren schools, who worked diligently with the students.

Theater was the highest institution of culture for the Prizren, in the past.

Professional Theater of Prizren

Professional Theater of Prizren was founded in 2006 and since then the theater has performed a lot of plays. First show of this theater was performed in 2007 and was called "Im atë donte Adolfin" (My dad loved Adolf). The scenario for this performance was written by Mehmet Kraja and the director was Agim Sopi. Besides Prizren, this show was performed abroad the city, in "Flaka e Janarit" (Flame of the January) — Gjilan, where the theater was awarded as the best show. Another performances were "Dosja K" (Dossier K) and "Darka Publike"(Public Dinner). "Moncerati" was another famous show, where about 35-40 actors performed in the festival of century of Albania in 2012.

Thematic of "Moncerati" was about an uprising of some people that was slaved. This was the strongest reason why people loved this performance. Next was a performance called "Trenat" (Trains) which took place in "Festivali i Apollonise" in antic theater. This performance was performed also in Kukaj village, where the theater was awarded as the best show. The benefits of this theater come from the spectators who see it.

Cultural-Artistic Society "Agimi"

Cultural-Artistic Society Agimi is the first organization of this character in Kosovo. CAS Agimi was founded in November 1944. This moment shows the beginnings of flowering of cultural-artistic activities, at amateur level for Prizren citizens. First activities were organized from a cultural team, which firstly was named "Ekipi kulturor i Komitetit Shqiptar". The first performances of this team had a mosaic character, choral songs, recitals and folk songs. Since the foundations of CAS Agimi, a number of 5000 members more than 2000 times have performed different character activities in front of Albanian, Turkish, Italian, German and even Algerian audiences presenting precious part of Prizren's Culture. Performances of CAS Agimi have not only national values, but also including a large amount of values of different nations. Undoubtedly that their performances are awarded by decorates and gratitude. By the increasing the number of members and sections, "Ekipi Kultulor i Komitetit Shqiptar" becomes Cultural-Artistic Society "Agimi". The indicator was prof. Zekerija Rexha. CAS Agimi consists of 200 regular members, who practice the activities in several sections.
 Mix Choir
 Folk Orchestra with Singer
 Folklore Ensemble
 Group of Literary and Recitative
 Group of Painting and Artistic Photos
 Group of Entertaining Music
 Drama
The first leader was chosen Anton Çeta. Thereby were set the foundations of the most ancient society among the Kosovo's Albanians. Mix Choir of CAS Agimi is the first section by which the society started activities. It is the only Mix Amateur Choir in Kosovo that works for 7 decades. The Choir is a choral ensemble of enviable artistic level.

Theater on stilts Merula 
Theater on stilts is a theatrical group consist of some people that stands on stilts and make performances like (walking, dancing, singing or other walk acts) with stilts. This group performs in open spaces, it means that there is not necessary for stage, sound system, lighting or different things that cost or take a lot of time to make an amazing spectacle, so simply by helping of some stilts and costumes this group show an incredible performance that arouse satisfaction, enjoyment on everyone who attend this group's performances. Theater on stilts intentionally gives up exhausting technique and light effect for the possibility to perform everywhere and accessible for everyone. Stilts, costumes and objects of production are made by local artisans remain in possession of the theater company in Prizren and form the basis for further work alone. The stilts, as the smallest possible stage, combined by drama with virtuoso, accomplished by body use is all what a theater on stilts gives to its audience. Through the collective game, young people learn to empathize with their playing partner, experienced solidarity and group strength across ethnic, social or religious boundaries. The acting abilities of individuals and the group cause an immediate reaction of the audience and can be experienced as positive feedback for one's own risk.

Theater on Stilts Merula is the first independent theater formed in the Balkans that functions as a theater on stilts in public space. Showing walk acts and processions at all kinds of events and festivals or full length straight theater in public spaces, giving a wide repertoire. This unique theater form was significantly developed by the independent theater company "Die Stelzer" *since the 1980s. The group was founded and run during a theater workshop, that was implemented by Xchange Perspectives e.V. and Awo Kosova during the International Dokufest Prizren 2013. First performance started with a writing workshop in which young people wrote their own texts in different languages. In a second step, the young actors learn to professionally move on stilts. At the same time, the sample version of the texts is written in cooperation with Kosovar authors. Finally, a 40-minute theater on stilts is developed and premiered at the DokuFest 2013 by 12 performers. It follows a small tour in Kosovo and oversees the establishment of the first stilt theater company in Kosovo.

Amateur Theater – Kısa Devre Tiyatro Topluluĝu
Amateur Theater Kısa Devre Tiyatro Topluluĝu (en: Association of short-time Theater) is the first amateur theater in Prizren in Turkish Language. It was founded in 2012 by ideas of some friends Zani Arapi, Husein Minci, Abdullah Papic headed by Deniz Dadale who actually is the director of theater's performances. Untiring work of actors, who are already volunteers of the theater have shown that Kisa Devre Tiyatro Toplulugu has his own importance in Prizren's Culture. Theater has 35 regular members. All performances are made by actors of the theater. Most well-known performances of this theater are: Hababam Sınıfı (en: Vagabons' Class), Aşk olsun (en:Well done), Şirinler (en: Smurfs).
Performances were performed in Prizren in other cities of Kosova.

Cinema

DokuFest
The International Documentary and Short Film Festival, Dokufest, is the largest film event in Kosovo. The festival started in 2002 and it is organised every year during the summer in the picturesque and historical town of Prizren. Films are screened throughout the day and night in several cinemas located around Prizren.

Various events happen within the scope of the festival: Filming workshops for kids and adults, photo exhibitions, concerts, and with the adding of DokuTech, technology fairs and workshops too.

Except for its films and workshops, the festival is also well known for its lively after screening music nights— DokuNights .

In 2015, Dokufest attracted over 60.000 visitors. In total 3050 entries from 92 countries were received, and 228 films were screened in 8 different cinemas. Nearly 200 accredited journalists reported from the festival, of which more than a hundred were from national and local media outlets and nearly 40 foreign journalists from 21 countries.

Since its establishment, Dokufest has proven that through consistent work and dedication, a volunteer based organization with almost no funding could become one of the leading cultural organizations in Kosovo and in the Balkans.

DokuKino

Opened in 2013, DokuKino marks the return of the cinema in Prizren. DokuKino is located in the Cultural Center "Complex Europe", and consists of two movie theaters, a 120-seat indoor movie theater and a 400-seat outdoor cinema. It is managed by Dokufest and its program mostly consists of commercial films for adults and kids, and documentaries.

All this could not be accomplished without the help of Municipality of Prizren, European Union, Norwegian Embassy and US Embassy here in Kosovo.

Music

Zambaku i Prizrenit- The Lily of Prizren

Zambaku i Prizrenit (The Lily of Prizren), was founded in 1986 from cultural institutions of Kosovo of that time, as the only cultural event that cultivates the urban music genre, such as ballads and serenades.
The ideologist behind this festival was the musical editor, Reshat Randobrava, assisted by the program editor of that time, Akil Koci. This festival focuses more on the traditional Albanian songs, but some editions have also had performances by other ethnic groups from Kosovo.

Hasi Jehon — Echo of Hasi

This event takes place annually since 1976, Hasi Jehon (Echo of Hasi) held in early May in Gjonaj village, 15 km far from Prizren. About 20 ensembles from across the country gather here in the Hasi region to perform music and dance. Also there are exhibitions of traditional of Hasi clothes and crafts. "Hasi Jehon Festival" is viewed every year by up to ten thousand visitors from Kosovo and abroad. In this event many artistic group from Kosovo, Albania, Macedonia and Montenegro present their folk values and source traditional music.

NgomFest

Ngomfest is a Music festival that takes place every June in Prizren. It started in 2011 and it has been the host of many alternative singers and bands from all over the world.

NgomFest was awarded with "The Most Watched Event In 2011" in Prizren.

Festivals

40 Bunar Fest

One of the Kosovo's craziest race is Prizren's 40 Bunar River Tubing Festival. In this competition participants must get down through the Lumbardhi River from the Electrical Industry Museum to the Stone Bridge in the city center.

To get down the river participants use a tractor inner tire. This race is called Kosovo's craziest race because of how challenging the trail is: Low water levels, protruding rocks and freezing water.

40 Bunar Fest is a traditional festival that takes place every year in the Lumbardhi river of Prizren. This event is known as an extreme sport.

The event is organized by "Shoqnia e Sportisteve t'Kfillt" (Society of Sober Sportsmen).

Comic Strip and Cartoon Festival

This festival is held annually in October in Prizren and is organized by the association of Strip artists "Xhennet Comics".
Comic-Strip and cartoon Festival gathers professional and amateur artist around the world. These artists exhibit their cartoon and Strip in the gallery of Gazi Mehmed Pasha's Hamam. There are invited also a lot of world-wide masters of this "apprenticeship". A lot of artists of Comic and Cartoon movies from 36 different countries take part in comic-strip and cartoon Festival. Among them there are artists from Bosnia and Herzegovina, Serbia, Macedonia, Germany, Malaysia, Turkey and Romania. This festival includes a number of workshops where many people are involved in.

Religion
Prizren is inhabited by Albanians, Turks, Serbs, Gorani, Bosniaks and Roma.

In the mosaic of religious ethnic of the citizens of Prizren dominates the Islamic faith. Catholicism, Orthodoxy and other minor faiths are also present. Prizren has a substantial number of Mosques, Eastern Orthodox Church, Catholic Church, Khanqah, Tombs and Mausoleum, which together create grandeur and harmony of religious architecture in Prizren.

In the center of Prizren, Shadervan, are located Sinan Pasha Mosque, Cathedral of Saint George, Prizren and the Cathedral of Our Lady of Perpetual Succour.

And when you look from the neighborhood called Topokli, the minaret and the domes of these three different religious temples can be seen, as they stand by each other carrying the long tradition and conveying the message of religious tolerance from centuries. In this city there are no national divisions, since communication among people is done in community languages.

Prizren's Craft Works
Prizren is also known for the development of trade due to its association with the Silk Road. Prizren was the bridge connecting: Pristina, Skopje, Tirana and Montenegro. In the past, the development of the city was closely related to developments in terms of handicrafts, trade, and the road network.

Throughout history, Prizren was even developed in a greater rate, and was one of the most important craft centers of the Balkans. In many workshops, different kinds of crafts were developed. Their number increase gradually, from century to century, so that in the second part of 19th, its number achieved the maximum possible, were 124 types of handicrafts, in over 1384 workshops were developed. The most prevalent crafts were: craft of weapons, jewelry, saddle-workers, black smith, blade-workers, furrier etc. In the 19th century Prizren was the second most important economic and trade center within Albanian territories with approximately 1.500 workshops, at the end of this period. Despite this, the city of Prizren still has masters who form exemplary of different kinds that are used in everyday life or are sold as souvenirs.

Filigrani
It is an ancient craft that uses mainly silver and gold to produce very fine artwork. Its origin is believed to come since the Egyptians, however, it is supposed that in Kosovo is presented since the 15th century. Today there are about 10 family businesses of filigran in Prizren that are active in producing interesting works.

Clothes
In Prizren we can see a lot of weddings during the summer. On those weddings women are dressing with traditional clothes. Women are coated with white "dimi", silky white "gjymlek", silver waist belt, vest (doublet) or in "kaftan" they also put their jewelries. Prizren has a lot of different ethnic outfits. Here live in harmony: Albanians, Serbs, Turks, Gorani, Bosnians, Roma and many other groups. They live in peace and tolerance with beautiful dresses and models which demonstrate traditional similarity, but they different in clothing lines and the good symbol interaction. Some characteristic components of the traditional clothing in Prizren region are: shirts, "kracas", "dimiet", silk shirts, doublet, aprons, socks," opingas", scarf, jewelry (mostly in Opoja); shirts, two aprons, shirt, long hark, jacket, overcoat with many patterns, nausea and woolen socks with different colors (in the area of Gora).

Cuisine
Cuisine of Prizren is diverse and it is recognized among the best known in the region. It includes repiecpts from Mediterranean, Middle Eastern and Central European cuisine. In every corner and street of Prizren, tourists may be served with Prizren style Ćevapi, Pljeskavica and Burek. Other common specialities are Goulash, Spanakopita, Sarma (food), Dolma, Moussaka, Prizren Tava and Elbasan Tava. The city is very well known for its homemade Pastirma, Prosciutto, Sujuk, Yogurt, Mayonnaise and Torshi.

From sweets we can specify Baklava, Éclair, Tres leches cake, Cremeschnitte, Tulumba, Torte and Rice pudding. 

Rakia, Wine, Ayran and Boza are the most consumed drinks produced in the region.

References